Viktoriya Andreevna Agalakova (born 30 August 1996) is a Russian actress known for playing Nastya in the 2017 horror movie The Bride, starred as Marina in the 2018 horror film Mermaid: The Lake of the Dead, as Polina in 2019 Netflix series  To the Lake and as Natashia the captain of an intergalactic football team in the feature film  Cosmoball (Goalkeeper of the Galaxy) in 2020.

Early life 
Viktoriya Andreevna Agalakova (was born on August 30, 1996, in St. Petersburg, Russia, to parents who were originally from Ust-Kamenogorsk in Kazakhstan. Agalakova was a very active child so at six years of age, her mother sent her to the St. Petersburg Music Hall theatre in an attempt to pacify her hyperactivity. At age 14, she joined the St. Petersburg Theatre of Musical Comedy, performing in "Aladdin."

Career
Agalakova’s first role was in a historical film "Harmony is the City of Happiness" at the age of 12, but the film was never released.
Agalakova played lead role of Nastya in the 2017 horror movie The Bride Agalakova starred as Marina in the 2018 horror film Mermaid: The Lake of the Dead, about a killer mermaid. The same year landing another main role as Yulia Granovskaya in the Ukrainian television series Sledy v proshloe (Traces of the Past). In 2020,  Agalakova starred as Polina in 2020 Netflix series  To the Lake, and as Natasha, the captain of an intergalactic football team in the feature film Cosmoball.

Filmography

Film

Television

References

External links
 
SV Casting profile - Viktoriya Agalakova
Viktoriya Agalakova Instagram

1996 births
Living people
Actresses from Saint Petersburg
21st-century Russian actresses
Russian film actresses
Russian television actresses
Russian stage actresses